Michael ByungJu Kim (born 1963) is a Korean American billionaire businessman. He is the co-founder and partner of MBK Partners, a private equity firm headquartered in Seoul, South Korea. He has been called the "Godfather of Asian private equity".

Early life
Michael B. Kim was born in Jinhae, South Gyeongsang Province in 1963. Kim graduated from Haverford College in 1985 with a degree in English. Kim received an MBA from the Harvard Business School in 1990 and received a Fulbright Scholarship afterwards.

Career
Kim begin his career as a mergers and acquisitions banker at Goldman Sachs after graduating from Harvard. In 1995, he joined Salomon Smith Barney, where he became Managing Director and COO of Asia-Pacific Investment Banking. He later joined the Carlyle Group as a president of Carlyle Asia until 2005.

Kim left Carlyle to found MBK Partners in 2005, which has since grown to over $23.4 billion in assets under management, raising $6.5 billion for its most recent Fund V, becoming the largest independent private equity fund in Asia.

Kim has been notable for breaking several records in the South Korean market. His takeover of ING Korea and listing on the market, was the first time a private-equity owned company listed on exchanges in South Korea. His takeover of Tesco subsidiary Homeplus was the largest private equity deal in South Korea's history.

In Japan, Kim and MBK Partners acquired Godiva Japan in one of the largest deals in the consumer sector in Japan's history. In China, Kim and MBK Partners acquired eHi Car Services, one of the largest car rental and services companies in China.

Kim is or has been on the boards of Harvard Business School, Haverford College, KorAm Bank, China Network Systems, Yayoi, C&M, Tasaki, Universal Studios Japan, Coway, ING Life Korea, Homeplus, RAND Corporation, the Metropolitan Museum of Art, New York Public Library  and Carnegie Hall.

In 2013 the Asian Venture Capital Journal honored Kim as "Private Equity Professional of the Year," and in Finance Asia's 20th anniversary issue in 2016, Kim was dubbed the "Godfather of Asian Private Equity". 

Kim was featured prominently in the August 18, 2022, Financial Time's article, "How South Korea learned to love private equity," which reaffirmed Kim as the "godfather of Asian private equity" and one of the founding pioneers of the industry in the region.

In 2015 Kim was ranked #42 on Bloomberg's 50 Most Influential. Kim appeared on the cover of the July 2020 edition of Forbes Asia. 

In 2021, Kim was ranked #5 on Forbes' The Richest Private Equity Billionaires, and in 2022, Kim was ranked #3 on Forbes' Korea's 50 Richest, with a net worth of $7.7 billion.

In January 2022, Kim's firm, MBK Partners, sold approximately a 13% stake to Dyal Capital Partners in a transaction valued at about $1 billion.

Kim is the author of the novel, "Offerings", a national best seller, published in 2020.

On July 8, 2022, the Washington Post reported that Kim was among those interested in buying the Washington Nationals, the MLB team.

Philanthropy
In 2010, Kim pledged $7.5 million toward the construction of a new dormitory at Haverford College.

In 2018, Kim endowed $7 million toward the Michael B. Kim Associate Professorship for Asian business leadership at Harvard Business School.

In August 2021, Kim pledged KRW30 billion ($27 million) to the Seoul Metropolitan Government to build a public library in Seoul, Korea. Mayor Oh Se-hoon announced Seoul will honor the gift by naming the library after the donor, The Seoul Public Kim ByungJu Library. The gift is reported to represent the first-ever donation by an individual for the construction of a civic institution in Seoul.

In December 2021, Kim was honored in Forbes Asia's Heroes of Philanthropy list.

In September 2022, Kim donated $10 million to the Metropolitan Museum of Art in New York. The museum will name a gallery after Kim and his wife, the Michael B. Kim and Kyung Ah Park gallery. This will be the first gallery in the museum to be named after a person of Korean descent.

Personal life
Kim is married to Park Kyung-ah, the daughter of the late South Korean Prime Minister Park Tae-joon. Park also founded POSCO, the largest steel company in South Korea. They have two children and live in Seoul.

References

1963 births
Living people
South Korean company founders
Haverford College alumni
Harvard Business School alumni
People from Seoul
South Korean businesspeople
South Korean billionaires